The State Council of the Republic of Korea is the chief executive body and national cabinet of the Republic of Korea involved in discussing "important policies that fall within the power of the Executive" as specified by the Constitution. The most influential part of the executive branch of the Government of South Korea are the ministries.

Member 

As of August 2020, the Executive Branch of the government operates 23 ministries, 18 administrative authorities, 2 boards, 4 offices, and 7 committees. The State Council includes 18 ministers, the prime minister and the president. Ministers must be appointed into the State Council before confirmation by the National Assembly. The president is the chairperson of the State Council, and the prime minister is the vice-chairperson.

Although not the official members of the State Council the following individuals, and other officials designated by law or deemed necessary by the Chairperson of the State Council, can also attend  State Council meetings and speak in front of the State Council without the right to vote on the matters discussed in the meetings of the SC-ROK. The individuals are:

Presidential Chief of Staff(대통령비서실장)
Director of the National Security Office(국가안보실장)
 Chief Presidential Secretary for Policy(대통령정책실장)
 Minister of Government Policy Coordination(국무조정실장)
 Minister of Patriots and Veterans Affairs(국가보훈처장)
 Minister of Personnel Management(인사혁신처장)
 Minister of Government Legislation(법제처장)
 Minister of Food and Drug Safety(식품의약품안전처장)
 Chairperson of Korea Fair Trade Commission(공정거래위원회위원장)
 Chairperson of Financial Services Commission(금융위원회위원장)
 Vice Minister of Science, Technology and Innovation(과학기술혁신본부장)
 Minister of Trade(통상교섭본부장)
 Mayor of Seoul(서울특별시장)

The Mayor of Seoul, although being the head of a local autonomous region in South Korea and not directly related to the central executive branch, has been allowed to attend State Council meetings considering the special status of Seoul as a Special City and its mayor as the only cabinet-level mayor in Korea.

Current Ministers

Role
The State Council is the highest body for policy deliberation and resolution in the executive branch of the Republic of Korea. Article 89 of the South Korean constitution specifies what "important policies that fall within the power of the Executive" the State Council has to deliver:

It has to be noted that the State Council of the Republic of Korea performs somewhat different roles than those of many other nations with similar forms. As the Korean political system is basically a presidential system yet with certain aspects of the parliamentary system combined, the State Council of the Republic of Korea also is a combination of both systems. More specifically, the Korean State Council performs policy resolutions as well as policy consultations to the President. Reflecting that the Republic of Korea is basically a presidential republic the State Council resolutions cannot bind the president's decision, and in this regard the Korean State Council is similar to those advisory counsels in strict presidential republics. At the same time, however, the Constitution of the Republic of Korea specifies in details 17 categories including budgetary and military matters, which necessitates the resolution of the State Council in addition to the President's approval, and in this regard the Korean State Council is similar to those State Councils in strict parliamentary systems.

Meetings
Although the president is the chairman of the council, the Prime Minister nevertheless frequently holds the meetings without the presence of the President as the meeting can be lawfully held as long as the majority of the State Council members are present at the meeting. Also, as many government agencies have recently been moved out of Seoul into other parts of the country, the need to hold State Council meetings without having to convene in one place at the same time has been growing, and therefore the law has been amended to allow State Council meetings in a visual teleconference format.

See also
Cabinet of North Korea

References 

Government of South Korea
South Korea